The men's 1500 metres event at the 2004 World Junior Championships in Athletics was held in Grosseto, Italy, at Stadio Olimpico Carlo Zecchini on 13 and 15 July.

Medalists

Results

Final
15 July

Heats
13 July

Heat 1

Heat 2

Heat 3

Participation
According to an unofficial count, 37 athletes from 25 countries participated in the event.

References

1500 metres
1500 metres at the World Athletics U20 Championships